The following articles relate to the history, geography, geology, flora, fauna, structures and recreation in Grand Teton National Park.

Grand Teton National Park history

 Exploration
 Hayden Geological Survey of 1871
 Raynolds Expedition
 Rocky Mountain Fur Company
 Native Americans
 Shoshone people
 People
 Explorers
 Jim Bridger - Mountain man familiar with Northwest Wyoming who was the guide of the Raynolds Expedition
 John Colter - First person of European descent to enter Jackson Hole and see the Teton Range
 Warren Angus Ferris - Early Yellowstone and Teton region trapper
 Ferdinand Vandeveer Hayden - U.S. Geological Surveys 1871-1875 of Yellowstone and Teton region
 David Edward Jackson - Known as "Davey" Jackson and namesake for Jackson Hole
 Donald Mackenzie - Explorer of western Wyoming
 William F. Raynolds - Supervised first U.S. Government sponsored expedition (Raynolds Expedition) to enter Jackson Hole
 Alexander Ross - Early fur trader in Yellowstone and Teton region
 Landowners
 John D. Rockefeller, Jr.
 Laurance S. Rockefeller
 Snake River Land Company
 Developers
 Maxwell Struthers Burt
 Park superintendents and administrators
 Horace M. Albright
 Park rangers
 Mountaineers
 Albert R. Ellingwood
 Glenn Exum
 Exum Mountain Guides
 Fritiof Fryxell
 John Gill
 Nathaniel P. Langford
 William O. Owen
 Paul Petzoldt
 Franklin Spencer Spalding
 Engineers and architects
 Gilbert Stanley Underwood
 Photographers, artists and illustrators
 Heinrich C. Berann - Panoramic artist
 Albert Bierstadt - Early Yellowstone artist
 William Henry Jackson - US Geological Survey photographer 1869-1878
 Thomas Moran - Early Yellowstone artist - guest member of 1871 Hayden Geological Survey
 Naturalists and scientists
 A. Starker Leopold - author of the 1963 Leopold Report-Wildlife Management in the National Parks
 Adolph Murie - National Park Service wildlife biologist - published seminar study on coyotes in Yellowstone (1940)
 Olaus Murie
 Margaret Murie
 Politicians
 Calvin Coolidge
 Franklin Delano Roosevelt
 Promoters
 Historic events
 History of the National Park Service
 Mission 66 - National Park Service ten-year program to prepare parks for 1966 50th Anniversary
 Teton–Yellowstone tornado - F4 tornado - July 21, 1987
 Yellowstone fires of 1988
 Advocates
 Greater Yellowstone Coalition
 Yellowstone to Yukon Conservation Initiative
 Concessionaires

Geography
 Park units and related areas
 Bridger-Teton National Forest
 Caribou-Targhee National Forest
 Jackson Hole National Monument
 Jedediah Smith Wilderness
 National Elk Refuge
 Rivers
 Buffalo Fork
 Cascade Creek
 Gros Ventre River
 Pacific Creek
 Snake River
 Lakes
 Amphitheater Lake
 Arrowhead Pool
 Bearpaw Lake
 Bradley Lake
 Cirque Lake
 Cow Lake
 Coyote Lake
 Delta Lake
 Dudley Lake
 Elk Ranch Reservoir
 Emma Matilda Lake
 Forget-me-not Lakes
 Grizzly Bear Lake
 Holly Lake
 Icefloe Lake
 Indian Lake
 Jackson Lake
 Jenny Lake
 Kit Lake
 Lake of the Crags
 Lake Solitude
 Lake Taminah
 Laurel Lake
 Leigh Lake
 Marion Lake
 Mica Lake
 Mink Lake
 Phelps Lake
 Ramshead Lake
 Rimrock Lake
 Snowdrift Lake
 String Lake
 Surprise Lake
 Taggart Lake
 Talus Lake
 Timberline Lake
 Trapper Lake
 Two Ocean Lake
 Mountains 
 Bivouac Peak
 Blacktail Butte
 Buck Mountain
 Cathedral Group
 Cleaver Peak
 Cloudveil Dome
 Disappointment Peak
 Doane Peak
 Dry Ridge Mountain
 Eagles Rest Peak
 Elk Mountain
 Forellen Peak
 Grand Teton
 Green Lakes Mountain
 Littles Peak
 Maidenform Peak
 Middle Teton
 Moose Mountain
 Mount Bannon
 Mount Hunt
 Mount Jedediah Smith
 Mount Meek
 Mount Moran
 Mount Owen
 Mount Saint John
 Mount Wister
 Mount Woodring
 Nez Perce Peak
 Owl Peak
 Prospectors Mountain
 Ranger Peak
 Raynolds Peak
 Red Mountain
 Rendezvous Mountain
 Rock of Ages
 Rockchuck Peak
 Rolling Thunder Mountain
 Shadow Peak
 Signal Mountain
 South Teton
 Static Peak
 Survey Peak
 Symmetry Spire
 Table Mountain
 Teepe Pillar
 Teewinot Mountain
 The Jaw
 The Wall
 Thor Peak
 Traverse Peak
 Veiled Peak
 Window Peak
 Canyons and Valleys 
 Avalanche Canyon
 Cascade Canyon
 Colter Canyon
 Death Canyon
 Garnet Canyon
 Granite Canyon
 Hanging Canyon
 Jackson Hole
 Leigh Canyon
 Moran Canyon
 Open Canyon
 Paintbrush Canyon
 Snowshoe Canyon
 Valhalla Canyon
 Waterfalls Canyon
 Webb Canyon
 Glaciers
 Falling Ice Glacier
 Middle Teton Glacier
 Petersen Glacier
 Schoolroom Glacier
 Skillet Glacier
 Teepe Glacier
 Teton Glacier
 Triple Glaciers
 Roads and passes
 Resource development
 Jackson Hole Airport
 Jackson Lake Dam
 Minidoka Project
 John D. Rockefeller, Jr. Memorial Parkway

Geology

 Geologic formations
 Death Canyon Shelf
 Huckleberry Ridge Tuff
 Lava Creek Tuff
 Mesa Falls Tuff

Fauna
 American bison
 Amphibians and reptiles of Yellowstone National Park
 Bighorn sheep
 Grizzly bear
 Elk
 Gray wolf
 Mammals of Grand Teton National Park
 Snake River fine-spotted cutthroat trout
 Greater Yellowstone Ecosystem
 Leopold Report - Seminal 1963 Study: "Wildlife Management In The National Parks"
 Pronghorn
 Wolf reintroduction

Districts and structures

 National Register of Historic Places listings in Grand Teton National Park
 Developed areas
 Colter Bay Village
 Moose, Wyoming
 Moran, Wyoming
 Structures and historic areas
 Cascade Canyon Barn
 Chapel of the Sacred Heart
 Chapel of the Transfiguration
 Death Canyon Barn
 Double Diamond Dude Ranch Dining Hall
 Cunningham Cabin
 Jackson Lake Lodge
 Jackson Lake Ranger Station
 Jenny Lake Boat Concession Facilities
 Jenny Lake CCC Camp NP-4
 Jenny Lake Lodge
 Jenny Lake Ranger Station Historic District
 Leigh Lake Ranger Patrol Cabin
 Manges Cabin
 Menor's Ferry
 Miller Cabin
 Moose Entrance Kiosk
 Moran Bay Patrol Cabin
 Old Administrative Area Historic District
 Signal Mountain Lodge
 Snake River Land Company Residence and Office
 String Lake Comfort Station
 Upper Granite Canyon Patrol Cabin
 White Grass Ranger Station Historic District

 Guest ranches, dude ranches and private ranches
 4 Lazy F Dude Ranch
 AMK Ranch
 Bar B C Dude Ranch
 Geraldine Lucas Homestead-Fabian Place Historic District
 Highlands Historic District
 Kimmel Kabins
 Laurance S. Rockefeller Preserve
 Leek's Lodge
 Murie Ranch Historic District
 Ramshorn Dude Ranch Lodge
 Triangle X Barn
 White Grass Dude Ranch
 Working ranches
 Andy Chambers Ranch Historic District
 Grace and Robert Miller Ranch
 Hunter Hereford Ranch Historic District
 Mormon Row Historic District
 Vacation homes and personal residences
 Murie Residence
 The Brinkerhoff

Recreation
 Continental Divide Trail - Traverses southwest corner of the park
 List of hiking trails in Grand Teton National Park

Entrance communities
 Wyoming
 Jackson, Wyoming
 Jackson Hole Airport
 Highways
 John D. Rockefeller, Jr. Memorial Parkway - Connects Grand Teton National Park and Yellowstone
 U.S. Route 26 - Eastern entrance, Southern entrance
 U.S. Route 89 - Northern entrance, Southern entrance
 U.S. Route 191 - Western entrance, Southern entrance
 U.S. Route 287 - Eastern entrance, Northern entrance

See also

References 
Culpin, Mary Shivers. National Register of Historic Places Multiple Property Documentation Form: Grand Teton National Park Multiple Property Submission. National Park Service 1995 
 
 

Grand Teton National Park